The affordable housing gap is a phenomenon in which the availability of affordable housing is less than the demand. It is directly related to social, racial, and economic inequality, and primarily impacts lower income households. The lack of adequate affordable housing can have adverse consequences for families and communities.

By Country

India 
India has a fast growing populace and economy. The National Buildings Organisation (NBO) reported a total shortage of 18.78 million homes in urban areas in 2012. By economic group, this urban housing shortage is 10.55 million in the Economically Weaker Section (total household income does not exceed 300,000 rupees), 7.41 in the Lower Income Group (total household income is between 300,000 and 600,000 rupees), and 0.82 million in the Middle Income Group and above (total household income exceeds 600,000 rupees).

United Kingdom 
The UK National Planning Policy Framework uses the "standard formula" to assess local housing need. The formula uses household growth projections, adjusted for affordability Critics of this method say that it does not account for the present backlog of housing. Households that live in poorly maintained or overcrowded accommodations would not be represented in the standard formula. A 2019 report estimates that 4.75 million households in Great Britain are in need of adequate affordable housing.

In the 2019 general election, both major political parties identified the housing gap as an obstacle for the country, and pledged to increase housing supply. The Parliament has a stated target of 300,000 new homes a year by the mid-2020s.

United States 
The United States Department of Housing and Urban Development (HUD) defines affordable housing as "housing on which the occupant is paying no more than 30 percent of gross income for housing costs, including utilities." HUD uses the terms "cost burdened" and "severely cost burdened" to describe individuals or families that spend more than 30% and 50% of their income on housing costs, respectively. According to the 2020 U.S. census, 46% of American renters are cost burdened, and 23% are severely cost burdened.
The affordable housing gap primarily impacts the lower-income households in America. A 2017 HUD survey found that 89% of extremely low income renter households were moderately or severely cost burdened. 83% of very low income households, 54% of low income households, 20% of moderate income households, and 6% of high income households met the same criteria.

See also 
 Housing crisis
 Housing inequality

References 

Housing